Tennis Ireland is the governing body for tennis for the island of Ireland, with responsibilities for clubs and competitions. It was founded in 1908 and has almost 180 affiliated clubs and with approximately 80,000 players. Tennis Ireland is divided into four Branches corresponding to the four provinces of Ireland, with its national headquarters located on the campus of Dublin City University. Tennis Ireland governs the Ireland Davis Cup team and the Ireland Billie Jean King Cup team.

History
Tennis Ireland was formed in 1908 as the Irish Lawn Tennis Association, a federation of 14 Irish tennis clubs. It became independent of the Lawn Tennis Association following the creation of the Irish Free State in 1922.

Competitions
 Davis Cup
 Fed Cup

Famous winners of the Irish Open

Ladies
 Lottie Dod - 1887
 Blanche Bingley Hillyard - 1888, 1894, 1897
 Elizabeth Ryan - 1919-1921, 1923
 Jadwiga Jędrzejowska - 1932
 Hilde Krahwinkel Sperling - 1934
 Helen Wills Moody - 1938
 Alice Marble - 1939
 Louise Brough - 1946
 Maureen Connolly - 1952, 1954
 Angela Mortimer - 1953
 Ann Haydon Jones - 1961
 Billie Jean King - 1963, 1969
 Maria Bueno - 1964, 1965
 Margaret Court - 1966, 1968, 1971, 1973
 Virginia Wade - 1970
 Evonne Goolagong Cawley - 1972

Men's
Allan Davidson – 1945
Rod Laver – 1962
Greg Rusedski – 1993, 1994, 1996

Irish Major Tournament Champions
Below is a list of Irish grand slam, Davis Cup, and Olympic champions. In total an Irish player has won singles grand slam on eight occasions, a doubles grand slam on five occasions and a mixed doubles grand slam on four occasions. Irish players have won six Olympic medals in tennis. Eight Irish individuals have either won a grand slam event or an Olympic medal in tennis. All of these victories occurred prior to Ireland's secession from the United Kingdom; as such these individuals competed under the flag of the United Kingdom rather than the Flag of Ireland.

List of Irish Grand Slam Men's Singles Champions

Wimbledon
Willoughby Hamilton – 1890
Joshua Pim – 1893, 1894
Harold Mahony – 1896

Australian Open
James Cecil Parke – 1912

List of Irish Grand Slam Men's Doubles Champions

Wimbledon
Joshua Pim – 1890, 1893
Frank Stoker – 1890, 1893
James Cecil Parke – 1912

List of Irish Grand Slam Women's Singles Champions

Wimbledon
Lena Rice – 1890

US Open
Mabel Cahill – 1891, 1892

List of Irish Grand Slam Women's Doubles Champions

US Open
Mabel Cahill – 1891, 1892

List of Irish Mixed Doubles Champions

Wimbledon
James Cecil Parke – 1914

US Open
Mabel Cahill – 1890, 1891, 1892

List of Irish Davis Cup Champions
James Cecil Parke – 1912*

List of Irish Olympic Medalists
John Boland – Gold: 1896 Men's Singles*, 1896 Men's Doubles*
Harold Mahony – Silver: 1900 Men's Singles*, 1900 Mixed doubles*  Bronze: 1900 Men's Doubles*  
James Cecil Parke – Silver: 1908 Men's Outdoor doubles*

*Participants competed for the British Isles

Irish Champions of Major professional tennis tournaments before the Open Era
Before the advent of the Open era of tennis competitions in April 1968, only amateurs were allowed to compete in established tournaments, including the four majors. However, many top tennis players turned professional to play legally for prize money in the years before the open era. There were also major pro events, where the world's top professional male players often played. These tournaments held with a certain tradition and longevity. According to Ellsworth Vines, "the Wembley tournament in London..., the U.S. professional championship, and to some extent the tournament in Paris were the major professional tournaments prior to 1968." Below is a list of Irish Champions at these events.

Men's Doubles Champions

French Pro Championship
Albert Burke – 1936

Clubs
Claremont Railway Tennis Club
Fitzwilliam Lawn Tennis Club

See also

Sport in Ireland
Irish Open

References

External links
 Tennis Ireland 1908-2008
 The Shelbourne Irish Open
 Tennis Ireland
 Tennis Ireland - Ulster Branch
 Fed Cup Current Rankings

Ireland
 
Tennis
Tennis
1908 establishments in Ireland